The 2019 European Darts Grand Prix was the sixth of thirteen PDC European Tour events on the 2019 PDC Pro Tour. The tournament took place at Glaspalast, Sindelfingen, Germany, from 10 to 12 May 2019. It featured a field of 48 players and £140,000 in prize money, with £25,000 going to the winner.

Michael van Gerwen was the defending champion after defeating James Wade 8–3 in the final of the 2018 tournament, but he lost 6–3 to Peter Wright in the quarter-finals.

Ian White became the eighth player to win multiple European Tour titles after beating Wright 8–7 in the final. It was White's third consecutive final on the European Tour, a record matched only by Van Gerwen.

Prize money
This is how the prize money is divided:

 Seeded players who lose in the second round do not receive this prize money on any Orders of Merit.

Qualification and format
The top 16 entrants from the PDC ProTour Order of Merit on 4 April will automatically qualify for the event and will be seeded in the second round.

The remaining 32 places will go to players from six qualifying events – 18 from the UK Tour Card Holder Qualifier (held on 12 April), six from the European Tour Card Holder Qualifier (held on 12 April), two from the West & South European Associate Member Qualifier (held on 9 May), four from the Host Nation Qualifier (held on 9 May), one from the Nordic & Baltic Associate Member Qualifier (held on 2 February) and one from the East European Associate Member Qualifier (held on 9 March).

From 2019, the Host Nation, Nordic & Baltic and East European Qualifiers will only be available to non-tour card holders. Any tour card holders from the applicable regions will have to play the main European Qualifier.

Dave Chisnall, who was set to be the 12th seed, withdrew prior to the tournament draw due to family reasons. All seeds below him moved up a place, with Mervyn King becoming sixteenth seed, and an extra place being made available in the Host Nation Qualifier.

James Wade, the 10th seed, withdrew from the tournament after the draw and was not replaced, with his second round opponent Ryan Searle receiving a bye.

The following players will take part in the tournament:

Top 16
  Michael van Gerwen (quarter-finals)
  Gerwyn Price (third round)
  Ian White (champion)
  Daryl Gurney (third round)
  Adrian Lewis (second round)
  Rob Cross (second round)
  Mensur Suljović (second round)
  Peter Wright (runner-up)
  Jonny Clayton (third round)
  James Wade (withdrew)
  Michael Smith (third round)
  Joe Cullen (second round)
  Max Hopp (second round)
  Ricky Evans (second round)
  Darren Webster (third round)
  Mervyn King (second round)

UK Qualifier
  Jamie Hughes (semi-finals)
  Steve Beaton (semi-finals)
  Matthew Edgar (first round)
  Stephen Bunting (first round)
  Mark McGeeney (third round)
  Robert Owen (first round)
  Dave Prins (first round)
  Gavin Carlin (second round)
  Josh Payne (first round)
  Keegan Brown (third round)
  Nathan Aspinall (quarter-finals)
  Chris Dobey (second round)
  Ross Smith (second round)
  James Richardson (third round)
  Glen Durrant (first round)
  Ryan Searle (third round)
  Brendan Dolan (second round)

European Qualifier
  Niels Zonneveld (second round)
  Jeffrey de Zwaan (quarter-finals)
  Krzysztof Ratajski (second round)
  Dimitri Van den Bergh (second round)
  Vincent van der Voort (second round)
  Madars Razma (first round)

West/South European Qualifier
     Stefan Bellmont (first round)
  Michael Rasztovits (first round)

Host Nation Qualifier
  Daniel Klose (first round)
  Michael Hurtz (first round)
  Dragutin Horvat (first round)
  Ricardo Pietreczko (first round)
  Michael Rosenauer (first round)

Nordic & Baltic Qualifier
  Kim Viljanen (first round)

East European Qualifier
  Pero Ljubić (first round)

Draw

References

2019 PDC Pro Tour
2019 PDC European Tour
2019 in German sport
May 2019 sports events in Germany